MVW may refer to:

Michael Vincent Waller, contemporary composer
Man vs. Wild, a survival television series
MVW, the IATA code for Skagit Regional Airport
MVW, the station code for Mount Vernon (Amtrak station)
Model-View-Whatever, a computer programming paradigm adopted by the AngularJS framework